The Frankfurt Galaxy is an American football team in Frankfurt, Germany, that plays in the European League of Football (ELF).

History 
The Frankfurt franchise was announced in November 2020, as part of the inaugural season of the European League of Football. 
In March 2021, ELF announced it has reached an agreement with the NFL, to be able to use the team names from the days of NFL Europe. On the same day, it was announced Frankfurt will use the previous name of Frankfurt Galaxy.

Season-by-season

Honours
The team's honours:
 European League of Football – Championship game
 Winners: 2021
 European League of Football – Southern Division
 Champions: 2021

Logo 
The logo represents a galaxy in the colors purple and gold.

Stadium 
The Galaxy are playing their home games at the PSD Bank Arena.

Roster

Staff

References

External links
 Official website

European League of Football teams
American football teams in Germany
 
2021 establishments in Germany
Sport in Frankfurt
American football teams established in 2021